Gail Mabalane (née Nkoane; born 27 December 1984) is a South African actress, model, media socialite, businesswoman and singer. She is most notable for acting roles on South African television series "The Wild", and recently starred on tele-novel series "The Road", which airs on Mzansi Magic every weeknight. She plays Thandeka Khumalo on Blood and Water which is only available on Netflix.

Life and career

Early life 
Mabalane was born Gail Nkoane and raised in the town of Kimberley, Northern Cape in South Africa. She is the middle child of three children. Her mother entered her into her first pageant, "Miss Tinkerbell" when she was five years old. It was at this point that her family noticed her potential. In 2005, she was a Top 5 Miss SA Teen Finalist.

Breakthrough 
In 2010, Mabalane auditioned for and became a Top 10 Finalist on the 6th Season on Idols South Africa. She was the first to be eliminated from the Final Top 10 after performing "Please Don't Leave Me", originally by P!nk.

In 2011, Mabalane obtained her major acting debut role as Lelo Sedibe on the MNet TV Series "The Wild", alongside major South African actress Connie Ferguson. The show was later cancelled by MNet in 2013. In August 2015, she made her first appearance on South Africa's most viewed television soapie, Generations: The Legacy, once again alongside Connie Ferguson.

Filmography

Television

Films

Personal life 
Gail Mabalane was born on the 27 December 1984 in Kimberly, South Africa. Her mother entered her into pageant shows before her death from a long-term illness after her brother’s accidental death on Christmas Eve. In 2013, her father also passed away shortly after her wedding to Kabelo Mabalane.  Her father died later that year. Gail and Kabelo have two children.

References

External links 
 Twitter
 TVSA

1984 births
Living people
21st-century South African actresses
People from Kimberley, Northern Cape
People from Johannesburg